Las Lesznowolski  is a village in the administrative district of Gmina Grójec, within Grójec County, Masovian Voivodeship, in east-central Poland.

References

Las Lesznowolski